MidnightBSD is a free Unix, desktop-oriented operating system originally forked from FreeBSD 6.1, and periodically updated with code and drivers from later FreeBSD releases. Its default desktop environment, Xfce, is a lightweight user friendly desktop experience.

History and development 
MidnightBSD began as a fork from FreeBSD in 2005. The founder of the project, Lucas Holt, wished to create a BSD derived desktop operating system. He was familiar with several live CD projects, but not the work on TrueOS or DesktopBSD. At the same time, he also had an interest in GNUstep. The two ideas were folded into a plan to create a user friendly desktop environment.
MidnightBSD 0.1 was released based on the efforts of Lucas Holt, Caryn Holt, D. Adam Karim, Phil Pereira of bsdnexus, and Christian Reinhardt. This release features a modified version of the FreeBSD ports system. The ports system evolved into "mports" which includes fake support, generation of packages before installation, license tagging, and strict rules about package list generation and modification of files outside the destination. Many of these features were introduced in MidnightBSD 0.1.1.

Christian Reinhardt replaced Phil Pereira as the lead "mports" maintainer prior to the release of MidnightBSD 0.1. D. Adam Karim acted as the security officer for the first release. All release engineering is handled by Lucas Holt.

0.2 introduced a refined imports system with over 2000 packages. The Portable C Compiler was added on i386 in addition to the GNU Compiler Collection. Other changes include enabling ipfw and sound card detection on startup, newer versions of many software packages including Bind, GCC, OpenSSH, and Sendmail, as well as a Live CD creation system.

As of September 2021, the last release is version 2.1, with many features imported from FreeBSD 11. The default desktop environment was switched to xfce, but WindowMaker plus GNUstep is still available.

Etymology 
MidnightBSD is named after Lucas and Caryn Holt's cat, Midnight, a ten-pound black Turkish Angora.

License 
MidnightBSD is released under several licenses. The kernel code and most newly created code are released under the two-clause BSD license. There are parts under the GPL, LGPL, ISC, and Beerware licenses, along with three- and four-clause BSD licenses.

Reception 
Jesse Smith reviewed MidnightBSD 0.6 in 2015 for DistroWatch Weekly:

References

External links

Magus: The MidnightBSD build cluster
MidnightBSD Developer Blog

2007 software
FreeBSD